Chimwemwe is a constituency of the National Assembly of Zambia. It covers Garneton and the Chimwemwe suburb of Kitwe in Kitwe District of Copperbelt Province.

List of MPs

References

Constituencies of the National Assembly of Zambia
1973 establishments in Zambia
Constituencies established in 1973